Ashava or Ashawa is a village and valley in Ghorband District, Parwan Province of Afghanistan. It is noted for its cheese, Ashava cheese (Panir-e-Ashawa). A road connects it to Towtamdarreh-ye `Olyā in the east where it joins the A76 highway.

See also
 Parwan Province

References

External links
World Geographics map

Populated places in Parwan Province
Valleys of Afghanistan
Landforms of Parwan Province